Specklinia alexii is a species of orchid plant native to Costa Rica, Nicaragua.

References 

alexii
Flora of Costa Rica
Flora of Nicaragua
Plants described in 2001